Artemisia glacialis, the glacier wormwood, is a species of flowering plant in the aster family.

Uses
Artemisia glacialis is historically employed in liqueurs, as well as a digestive and stomachic preparations.

Hazards
Artemisia glacialis might cause dermatitis or other allergic reactions.

Notes

References

glacialis
Flora of France
Flora of the Alps
Plants described in 1863